"Better Together" is a song by American country music singer Luke Combs. It is the fifth single from his 2020 album What You See Is What You Get. Combs wrote the song with Dan Isbell and Randy Montana.

Content and history

Lyrically, the song features Combs "comparing himself and his lover to other necessary couplings." Billy Dukes of Taste of Country said of the song that "chose country touchstones that speak to who he is and — more importantly — who his fans are." Combs performed the song on October 15, 2020 on the telecast of the Billboard Music Awards. During the performance, he appeared in a suit and without his trademark baseball cap, and was accompanied solely by a piano player.

Chart performance

Weekly charts

Year-end charts

Certifications

References

2020 singles
2020 songs
Country ballads
2020s ballads
Songs written by Luke Combs
Songs written by Randy Montana
Columbia Nashville Records singles
Luke Combs songs
2021 singles